Uhelná Příbram is a market town in Havlíčkův Brod District in the Vysočina Region of the Czech Republic. It has about 500 inhabitants. 

Administrative parts
Villages and hamlets of Jarošov, Petrovice u Uhelné Příbramě, Přísečno and Pukšice are administrative parts of Uhelná Příbram.

References

Populated places in Havlíčkův Brod District
Market towns in the Czech Republic